Barclay Academy is a secondary school and sixth form located in Stevenage, Hertfordshire, England. The current head teacher is Dr. Matthew Laban.

Opening in 1949, it was the first purpose-built secondary school constructed in the UK after the Second World War and was awarded a Festival of Britain architectural award in 1951. In May 2019, the school celebrated its 70th anniversary.

The school contains a large bronze statue by Henry Moore, Family Group, which was placed at the school's main entrance and is now inside and can be seen in the front of the school. On 22 January 2018, the BBC visited the school to clear up why the statue had been moved, as there had been an attempted robbery on it in 2009.

The school was taken over by Future Academies Trust and converted into an academy in February 2019.

References 

Schools in Stevenage
Educational institutions established in 1949
Secondary schools in Hertfordshire
1949 establishments in England
Academies in Hertfordshire
Grade II listed educational buildings
Grade II listed buildings in Hertfordshire